Deal of a Lifetime is a 1999 US romantic comedy film starring Shiri Appleby, Michael A. Goorjian, and Kevin Pollak.

Plot
The film centers on the main character Henry Spooner (played by Goorjian), the school nerd who has a crush on Laurie, the prettiest, most popular girl in his high school. After a conversation with his friend, he mutters under his breath that he would sell his soul to the Devil to go out with Laurie. From that point on, he gets his wish to date Laurie, but things don't go according to plan.

Cast
 Michael A. Goorjian as Henry Spooner
 Shiri Appleby as Laurie Petler
 Kevin Pollak as Jerry
 Jennifer Rubin as Tina
 Ashley Buccille as Ramona
 Esteban Powell as Foster
 Eli Craig as Kevin Johnson
 Jane Carr as Nancy
 A.J. Buckley as Axe
 Shay Astar as Peggy Doozer
 Ron Glass as Mr. Creighton

Music
Part of the soundtrack includes the song "Let Yourself Go", which was written and performed by Los Angeles musician Paul Delph for his final album A God That Can Dance. The song is included in the final scene.

Reception

Home Media
The film was released on DVD on October 31, 2000.

References

External links
 
 

1999 films
1999 romantic comedy films
1990s high school films
American high school films
American romantic comedy films
Deal with the Devil
1990s English-language films
1990s American films